Robert William McGregor Boswell  (30 September 191117 February 1976) was a senior Australian public servant. He was best known for his time as Secretary of the Department of National Development.

Life and career
Bill Boswell was born on 30 September 1911 in Carlton, Melbourne.

From 1958, Boswell was Director of the Weapons Research Establishment at Salisbury in South Australia.

Between 1965 and 1969, Boswell was the Secretary of the Department of National Development.

Boswell died in Lucas Heights, Sydney on 17 February 1976.

Awards
While a research scholar at University of Melbourne, Boswell worked in a team of four using radio direction-finding to trace the movement of thunderstorms associated with cold fronts crossing the southern part of Australia, and for his work was awarded a Fred Knight scholarship.

Boswell was made an Officer of the Order of the British Empire in May 1956 for his role in guided weapons development.

References

1911 births
1976 deaths
Australian public servants
Officers of the Order of the British Empire
University of Melbourne alumni
Public servants from Melbourne
People from Carlton, Victoria